The 1905 New Zealand general election was held on Wednesday, 6 December in the general electorates, and on Wednesday, 20 December in the Māori electorates to elect a total of 80 MPs to the 16th session of the New Zealand Parliament. A total number of 412,702 voters turned out, with 396,657 (83.25% of the electoral roll) voting in the European electorates.

Changes to the electoral law
The 1903 City Single Electorates Act declared that at the dissolution of the 15th Parliament, the four multi-member electorates would be abolished and replaced each with three single-member electorates. It was also the year absentee voting was introduced for all electors unable to be in their own electorate on election day. The first Chief Electoral Officer was appointed.

 
 
 
 
 
 
 
 
 
 
 
 

Nine of these twelve electorates had existed before. Wellington Central, Wellington North, and Dunedin North were established for the first time.

Historic context
In 1905 a progressive faction within the Liberal Party started to form in opposition to Liberal leader Richard Seddon's policies. They announced that they would stand in the election as the New Liberal Party, however an accusation against Seddon's son, when disproven saw most of the dissidents return to the Liberal Party, and of the four New Liberals (George Laurenson, Francis Fisher, Harry Bedford and Tommy Taylor) that stood in the election only Laurenson and Fisher were returned.

The freshly created Independent Political Labour League also contested the election as a breakaway faction from the Liberals. It was the first of many steps of a gradual move by urban labourers shifting allegiance to an independent working-class political party. Previously, most workers had supported the Liberal Party, which since the 1890s had attempted to gain Trade Union support by appointing union representatives to the party's governing body. The IPLL did not perform well, gaining only 3,478 votes nationwide with no candidates elected.

The Rev Frank Isitt was the Prohibition candidate for several South Island electorates, and came second in two.

Results

Party totals
The following table gives party strengths and vote distribution.

Votes summary

Electorate results
The following are the results of the 1905 general election:

Key

|-
 |colspan=10 style="background-color:#FFDEAD" | General electorates
|-

|-
 |colspan=10 style="background-color:#FFDEAD" | Māori electorates
|-

|}

Notes

References